Sir Anthony Mildmay (died 1617) of Apethorpe Palace, Northamptonshire, served as a Member of Parliament for Wiltshire from 1584 to 1586 and as English ambassador in Paris in 1597.

Origins
Mildmay was the eldest son of Sir Walter Mildmay (d.1589) of Apethorpe, Chancellor of the Exchequer to Queen Elizabeth I and founder of Emmanuel College, Cambridge, by his wife  Mary Walsingham, a sister of Sir Francis Walsingham.

Career
He was educated at Peterhouse, Cambridge, and delivered an oration with much success when Queen Elizabeth I visited the College on 9 August 1564. He entered Gray's Inn in 1579. He served as Sheriff of Northamptonshire for 1580 and 1592. He was a Member of Parliament for Newton in Lancashire, in 1571, and for Wiltshire from 1584 to 1586. and for Westminster in 1597.

He was knighted in 1596, when he was appointed as Ambassador to France during the reign of King Henry IV of France. "I always knew him," wrote Chamberlain soon after Mildmay had settled in Paris, "to be paucorum hominum, yet he hath ever showed himself an honourable fast frend where he found vertue and desert". The French King complained of Mildmay's ungenial manner and of the coldness with which he listened to the praises of  Robert Devereux, 2nd Earl of Essex. At an interview in March 1597 Henry ordered him out of his chamber and threatened to strike him. He returned home later in the year, and declined an invitation to resume the post in 1598.

Marriage and children
In 1567 he married Grace (d. 27 July 1620), a daughter and co-heiress of Sir Henry Sharington (or Sherington) of Lacock Abbey, Wiltshire, by whom he left an only child and heiress:
Mary Mildmay, who married Francis Fane, 1st Earl of Westmorland and was the mother of Mildmay Fane, 2nd Earl of Westmorland.

Death and burial
He died on 11 September 1617 and was buried in St Leonard's Church, Apethorpe, where his elaborate marble monument with recumbent effigies of himself and his wife survives. His portrait survives at Emmanuel College, Cambridge.

References

Attribution

External links

"MILDMAY, Anthony (c.1549-1617) of Apethorpe, Northants" at historyofparliamentonline.org

1617 deaths
Alumni of Peterhouse, Cambridge
Ambassadors of England to France
16th-century births
People from North Northamptonshire
17th-century English diplomats
High Sheriffs of Northamptonshire
Walsingham family
Anthony
16th-century English diplomats
English MPs 1571
English MPs 1584–1585
English MPs 1597–1598
English knights
Knights Bachelor